James Peyton "Pate" Philip (born May 26, 1930),  is an American politician. A longtime Republican member of the Illinois General Assembly, Philip served both the Illinois House of Representatives and the Illinois Senate including a decade as the President of the Illinois Senate. He was known as a highly influential politician, both for the projects that he passed and blocked in state government and for his often-blunt comments.

Richard S. Williamson, the White House chief of intergovernmental affairs under Ronald Reagan, deemed him "one of the most important Republicans in the Midwest".

Background
Philip was born on May 26, 1930 in Elmhurst, Illinois. He attended York Community High School, Kansas City Junior College, and Kansas State College. Philip was drafted into the United States Marine Corps at the onset of the Korean War, though he was not deployed overseas. He was a district sales manager for Pepperidge Farm for 38 years and retired in 1992. He is married to Nancy and they have four children. James "Pate" Philip State Park, located in DuPage County, is named after Philip. Philip received a heart bypass at Elmhurst Memorial Hospital in June 2004. Philip's stepson Randy Ramey was appointed to the Illinois House in 2005.

Early political career
Philip was elected York Township Auditor in 1965 and was elected President of the Illinois Young Republicans the same year.

Illinois House
In 1965, the Illinois Supreme Court resolved a longstanding reapportionment issue and Philip opted to run for the Illinois House in the 37th district. The 37th district consisted of York, Addison, Bloomingdale and Wayne townships along with the City of West Chicago in Winfield Township. He was reelected as one of the district's three representatives with Gene L. Hoffman and Bill Redmond. During his first term, he was assigned to the Committees on Conservation, Fish and Game; Executive; Industry and Labor Relations. Republican Lee A. Daniels succeeded Philip as one of three House members from the 40th district as Republican Gene Hoffman and Democrat Bill Redmond were reelected.

Illinois Senate
In 1974, Republican incumbent Jack T. Knuepfer chose to retire from the Illinois Senate. Philip defeated John L. Benzin, a former member of the DuPage County Board of Tax Review, in the Republican primary. In the general election, Philip faced Democratic candidate Bud Loftus. In the aftermath of the Watergate scandal, Philip won 22,318 votes to Loftus's 20,984 votes; a slim 3.08% margin in then-staunchly Republican DuPage County.

Philip was chosen as the Illinois Senate Minority Leader in 1981 after the death of Dr. David C. Shapiro. Philip had been the assistant minority leader since 1979. In January 1993, after the Republicans gained a majority in the Illinois Senate, he was elected as President of the Illinois Senate and remained in that role until 2003 when Democrats became the majority. He retired shortly after his unopposed reelection and was replaced by Ray Soden.

Senate District
The 40th district to which Philip was elected was in northeastern DuPage County which would be the center of Philips' various constituencies during his Senate career. In the 1981 reapportionment, the 40th district was renumbered the 23rd district and included all of Addison Township and portions of York, Milton, Winfield, Bloomingdale, and Schaumburg townships. This map, drawn by Democrats, forced Philip to move from Elmhurst to Wood Dale. After Republicans won map-making power in 1991, the 23rd district included all of Addison Township, O'Hare International Airport, and portions of York Township in DuPage County and Schaumburg and Leyden townships in Cook County. In the 2001 decennial apportionment, the 23rd district lost its portions that were in Cook County and included all or parts of the localities of Bloomingdale, Roselle, Glendale Heights, Carol Stream, Glen Ellyn, Itasca, Addison, Wheaton, Winfield, Bensenville, Wood Dale, Elmhurst, Villa Park, and Lombard.

Political positions

Chicago school reform
Philip's oft-repeated pronunciations that giving more money to the Chicago public school systems would be like "pouring money down a rat-hole" helped provide the impetus for what Philip has said is one of his most important accomplishments—instituting a series of reforms that removed power from school boards rife with corruption. The major beneficiary of these reforms was Chicago mayor Richard M. Daley, who with Chief Executive Officer of Schools Paul Vallas removed previous money-wasting reformers from their posts and closed a $1.4 billion deficit over four years without the need to request more state funding. The legislative reforms also challenged the long-standing assertion from Philip's opponents (notably, the Chicago Teachers Union) that Philip harbored a strong dislike for Chicago and its school system.

Lake Calumet Airport
In 1990, Mayor Richard M. Daley, announced his proposal for the Lake Calumet Airport, which would have resulted in the demolition of all of Hegewisch, along with portions of Burnham and Calumet City. The airport faced staunch opposition from Hegewisch residents. Philip opposed the Lake Calumet Airport, believing an airport in Peotone, then regarded as an alternate site, would be better suited for an airport. He also opposed the state government paying $2 billion of the airport's costs. In the face of this opposition, Daley declared the airport proposal "dead" and focused on plans to expand O'Hare International Airport.

Criminal Justice
Philip's legislative stances on crime have been mixed. With backing from the gun lobby representing downstate hunters, Philip fought to reduce the penalty for illegal possession of firearms to a misdemeanor. However, he also fought to expand the death penalty to apply to all convicted murderers. The proposed legislation he endorsed also proposed mandatory 10–year prison sentences with no chance of parole for using firearms in a "safe retail zone", defined as shopping malls, strip malls and commercial districts with more than three stores. Philip expressed a preference for expanding this portion of the law to all gun-related crimes, not just safe retail zones. State's attorneys in the six-county Chicago metropolitan area agreed with Philip's stance on gun crimes, but were mixed with regards to changes in the death penalty.

DuPage Tollway
In June 1984, Philip, then the Republican minority leader of the Illinois House of Representatives, helped push through legislation authorizing the construction of a tollway,  Interstate 355, then referred to as simply the DuPage Tollway.

Controversy 
Philip has also been known for making numerous controversial comments on various topics throughout his career. Many, including former Illinois gubernatorial candidate Dawn Clark Netsch, labeled him as both holding and vocally expressing racial prejudice. However, Philip himself has said that he is not racist, saying "When you criticize minorities, whether you're right or wrong, their reaction is it's a racist remark."

During the corruption trial of former Gov. George Ryan's top aide Scott Fawell, "Pate" Philip was called as a witness. Prosecutors asked about Philip's 50 year high school reunion—a 1999 $15,000 bash at Navy Pier set up by Scott Fawell. Philip said he never asked for any special treatment, but was happily surprised by it. It was only after the Chicago Sun-Times revealed the party that Philip paid for it out of his campaign fund.

Also during the trial, prosecutors released a document including ten pages of favors granted to former Senate President Pate Philip.

Philip spoke with Larry Hall, who wore a hidden recorder and taped the conversations as a part of an undercover government investigation. Philip agreed to try to get Hall's sister a job with the secretary of state's office in exchange for Hall's fundraising activities. Prosecutors allege Hall gave $1,400 to Philip's campaign shortly after the conversation.

Philip has been criticized for looking into the voter histories of students applying for legislative scholarships, which are funded by the taxpayers of Illinois. In 2001, all five of Philip's scholarships went to Republican primary voters or to students whose parents voted Republican, and the same trend was observed over the prior five years.

Philip, with backing from the gun lobby, fought to reduce the penalty for illegal possession of firearms to a misdemeanor.

Electoral history
2002 Race for Illinois Senate  — 23rd district
Unopposed
1998 Race for Illinois Senate  — 23rd district
James "Pate" Philip (R), 31,347
Rita Gonzalez (D), 13,961
1994 Race for Illinois Senate  — 23rd district
James "Pate" Philip (R), 29,452
Keith Petropoulos (D), 13,100
1990 Race for Illinois Senate  — 23rd district
Defeated William C. Kaiser (D)

References 

|-

|-

|-

|-

|-

1930 births
Living people
Military personnel from Illinois
Presidents of the Illinois Senate
Republican Party Illinois state senators
Republican Party members of the Illinois House of Representatives
People from Elmhurst, Illinois
People from Wood Dale, Illinois
Kansas State University alumni